Academy of International Business (AIB) is the leading association of international business scholars and specialists. Established in 1959, it has over 3400 members in about 90 countries. Membership is open to organizations as well as individuals. The mission of the academy is to create, nurture, and empower a global community of scholars focused on creating, advancing, and disseminating knowledge in international business research, education, policy, and practice.

Publications
AIB publishes the Journal of International Business Studies (JIBS), the Journal of International Business Policy (JIBP), and the AIB Insights.

JIBS is the premier scholarly journal in the field of international business. Published since 1970, it is currently published nine times a year.  It is highly rated by the Social Sciences Citation Index (2020 2-year Impact Factor: 11.382, 5-year Impact Factor: 13.555) and is one of the 50 journals used by Financial Times to determine business school rankings.

JIBP is the principal outlet for theoretical and empirical research in all areas of policy that relate to international business. Published since 2008, it is currently published four times a year. The journal announced in May 2021 its addition to Emerging Citation Sources Index (ECSI).

AIB Insights is an open access journal and provides an outlet for short (around 2500 words), interesting, topical, current and thought-provoking articles. Articles can discuss theoretical, empirical, practical, or pedagogical issues affecting the international business community of researchers, practitioners, policy makers, and educators. It is currently published four times a year.

AIB also publishes an online newsletter and the proceedings of its annual conference.

Conferences
The Annual Meeting of the Academy of International Business is held each year in late June or early July. The location of its annual meeting rotates amongst the continents.

 2004 - Stockholm
 2005 - Quebec City
 2006 - Beijing
 2007 - Indianapolis
 2008 - Milan AIB celebrated its 50th anniversary.
 2009 - San Diego
 2010 - Rio de Janeiro
 2011 - Nagoya
 2012 - Washington, D.C.
 2013 - Istanbul
 2014 - Vancouver
 2015 - Bangalore
 2016 - New Orleans
 2017 - Dubai
 2018 - Minneapolis
 2019 - Copenhagen
 2020 - Virtual/Online
 2021 - Virtual/Online
 2022 - Miami

Chapters and Shared Interest Groups
AIB currently has 13 geographic chapters   Each chapter organizes an annual regional conference and may also publish its own newsletter and conference proceedings.

In addition, AIB has 4 shared interest groups (SIGs), communities within the larger academy where members can focus on developing their work within a specific subject area or research methodology.

References

External links 
Academy of International Business (AIB)
Journal of International Business Studies (JIBS)
Journal of International Business Policy (JIBP)
AIB Insights

Business and finance professional associations
Business organizations based in the United States